Las Vegas weddings refers to wedding ceremonies held in Las Vegas, Nevada, which came to be known as the "Marriage Capital of the World" because of the ease of acquiring a marriage license and the minimal costs involved. The city continues to be known as a popular wedding destination for the same reasons, but also as a result of the various types of weddings available.

Marriage license
Nevada marriage licenses are considered notoriously easy to get; there is no blood test or required waiting period. Las Vegas has streamlined the process further. Once a short form is completed and submitted to the marriage license bureau along with $77.00 cash or money order and a government-issued photo identification, a marriage license may be obtained within minutes until midnight every night. The ease of getting married was historically a deliberate choice of Nevada lawmakers to promote tourism.

Within one year of receipt of the marriage license a wedding ceremony must be performed in order to have a legal union, and marriages are legal and binding throughout the United States under the Full Faith and Credit Clause, as well as most other countries.

Wedding venues

There are numerous options for wedding ceremonies in Las Vegas. The least expensive option, costing $75.00, is to marry at the Office of Civil Marriages.

Most weddings performed in Las Vegas may be a civil or religious service depending upon the wedding venue selected.

Most of the city's major hotels have wedding chapels and many of the local restaurants offer wedding ceremonies. Weddings may also be performed in one of the local churches, synagogues, at one of the many golf courses, or at a free standing wedding chapel. Drive-thru weddings are also available.

Wedding chapels

The majority of the newer wedding chapels are located on the Las Vegas Strip. A local law in the 1970s made it impossible to build a free standing wedding chapel on the Las Vegas Strip. The older wedding chapels will be found downtown.

Themed weddings
Many chapels also offer themed weddings. Common themes include Hawaiian, Fairy Tale, Star Trek, Star Wars, Gothic, Halloween, and weddings with an Elvis impersonator or Michael Jackson impersonator. The Tropicana has offered a "rock star" wedding officiated by former Quiet Riot frontman Paul Shortino. Every year an electronic dance festival called Electric Daisy Carnival held at the Las Vegas Motor Speedway offers couples to marry during the festival with varied themes, these packages are an option when purchasing entry, prices range from $300-$700.

Outside Las Vegas
Second in popularity to the wedding chapel option is to have a ceremony performed outdoors somewhere in the surrounding Las Vegas area.

See also
Graceland Wedding Chapel

References

Weddings
Weddings in the United States